Activation-induced cytidine deaminase, also known as AICDA, AID and single-stranded DNA cytosine deaminase, is a 24 kDa enzyme which in humans is encoded by the AICDA gene.  It creates mutations in DNA by deamination of cytosine base, which turns it into uracil (which is recognized as a thymine).  In other words, it changes a C:G base pair into a U:G mismatch.  The cell's DNA replication machinery recognizes the U as a T, and hence C:G is converted to a T:A base pair. During germinal center development of B lymphocytes, AID also generates other types of mutations, such as C:G to A:T. The mechanism by which these other mutations are created is not well understood. It is a member of the APOBEC family.

In B cells in the lymph nodes, AID causes mutations that produce antibody diversity, but that same mutation process leads to B cell lymphoma.

Function 

This gene encodes a DNA-editing deaminase that is a member of the cytidine deaminase family. The protein is involved in somatic hypermutation, gene conversion, and class-switch recombination of immunoglobulin genes in B cells of the immune system.

AID is currently thought to be the master regulator of secondary antibody diversification. It is involved in the initiation of three separate immunoglobulin (Ig) diversification processes:
 Somatic hypermutation (SHM), in which the antibody genes are minimally mutated to generate a library of antibody variants, some of which with higher affinity for a particular antigen than any of its close variants
 Class switch recombination (CSR), in which B cells change their expression from IgM to IgG or other immune types
 Gene conversion (GC) a process that causes mutations in antibody genes of chickens, pigs and some other vertebrates.

AID has been shown in vitro to be active on single-strand DNA, and has been shown to require active transcription in order to exert its deaminating activity. The involvement of Cis-regulatory factors is suspected as AID activity is several orders of magnitude higher in the immunoglobulin "variable" region than other regions of the genome that are known to be subject to AID activity. This is also true of artificial reporter constructs and transgenes that have been integrated into the genome.  A recent publication suggests that high AID activity at a few non-immunoglobulin targets is achieved when transcription on opposite DNA strands converges due to super-enhancer activity.

Recently, AICDA has been implicated in active DNA demethylation.  AICDA can deaminate 5-methylcytosine, which can then be replaced with cytosine by base excision repair.

Mechanism 

AID is believed to initiate SHM in a multi-step mechanism. AID deaminates cytosine in the target DNA. Cytosines located within hotspot motifs are preferentially deaminated (WRCY motifs W=adenine or thymine, R=purine, C=cytosine, Y=pyrimidine, or the inverse RGYW G=guanine). The resultant U:G (U= uracil) mismatch is then subject to one of a number of fates.

 The U:G mismatch is replicated across creating two daughter species, one that remains unmutated and one that undergoes a C => T transition mutation. (U is analogous to T in DNA and is treated as such when replicated).
 The uracil may be excised by uracil-DNA glycosylase (UNG), resulting in an abasic site. This abasic site (or AP, apurinic/apyrimidinic) may be copied by a translesion synthesis DNA polymerase such as DNA polymerase eta, resulting in random incorporation of any of the four nucleotides, i.e. A, G, C, or T. Also, this abasic site may be cleaved by apurinic endonuclease (APE), creating a break in the deoxyribose phosphate backbone. This break can then lead to normal DNA repair, or, if two such breaks occur, one on either strand a staggered double-strand break can be formed (DSB). It is thought that the formation of these DSBs in either the switch regions or the Ig variable region can lead to CSR or GC, respectively.
 The U:G mismatch may also be recognized by the DNA mismatch repair (MMR) machinery, to be specific by the MutSα(alpha) complex. MutSα is a heterodimer consisting of MSH2 and MSH6. This heterodimer is able to recognize mostly single-base distortions in the DNA backbone, consistent with U:G DNA mismatches. The recognition of U:G mistmatches by the MMR proteins is thought to lead to processing of the DNA through exonucleolytic activity to expose a single-strand region of DNA, followed by error prone DNA polymerase activity to fill in the gap. These error-prone polymerases are thought to introduce additional mutations randomly across the DNA gap. This allows the generation of mutations at AT base pairs.

The level of AID activity in B cells is tightly controlled by modulating AID expression. AID is induced by transcription factors E47, HoxC4, Irf8 and Pax5, and inhibited by Blimp1 and Id2. At the post-transcriptional level of regulation, AID expression is silenced by mir-155, a small non-coding microRNA controlled by IL-10 cytokine B cell signalling.

Clinical significance 

Defects in this gene are associated with Hyper-IgM syndrome type 2. In certain haematological malignancies such as follicular lymphoma persistent AID expression has been linked to lymphomagenesis.

References

Further reading

External links 
 
 

Genes on human chromosome 12
Enzymes
EC 3.5.4
Immune system